Nenjil Oru Mull is a 1981 Indian Tamil-language film written and directed by Mathi Oli Shanmugam. A remake of the Hindi film Kati Patang (1971), which in turn was based on the 1948 novel I Married a Dead Man by Cornell Woolrich, it stars Poornima Jayaraman and Pratap. The film was released on 11 December 1981.

Plot

Cast 
 Poornima Jayaraman
 Pratap
 Sivachandran
 Calcutta Viswanathan
 V. K. Ramasamy

Production 
Nenjil Oru Mull is the first Tamil film for Poornima Bhagyaraj (née Jayaraman). The film is a remake of the Hindi film Kati Patang (1971), which in turn was based on the 1948 novel I Married a Dead Man by Cornell Woolrich. It was predominantly filmed in Coimbatore. One shot required Poornima to run on an overpass.

Soundtrack 
The soundtrack was composed by G. K. Venkatesh. This is the debut film for lyricist Ponnadiyan.

Release 
Nenjil Oru Mul was released on 11 December 1981, and failed commercially.

References

External links 
 

1980s Tamil-language films
Films scored by G. K. Venkatesh
Tamil remakes of Hindi films